"Wang Wang Blues" is a 1920 jazz composition written by Henry Busse, Gussie Mueller, and Theron E. "Buster" Johnson, with lyrics by Leo Wood. The song was released as a 78 single by Paul Whiteman and his Orchestra featuring Henry Busse on trumpet. The song is a pop and jazz standard.

Paul Whiteman recorded the song on August 9, 1920, in Camden, New Jersey. The song was released in December 1920 as a Victor 78 single, 18694-B. Ferde Grofe arranged the song. Paul Whiteman recorded and released the song three additional times. The Paul Whiteman recording was No. 1 for 6 weeks on the Billboard pop singles charts.

Personnel
The personnel on the August 9, 1920 recording at the Victor studios in Camden, New Jersey were: Paul Whiteman (violin, leader), Henry Busse (trumpet, 1918–1928), Ferde Grofe (piano, arranger, composer), Theron E. "Buster" Johnson (trombone, 1918–1920), Gus Mueller (clarinet, alto sax), Hale Byers (alto sax), Mike Pingitore (banjo), Sammy Heiss (tuba), and Harold McDonald (drums).

Other recordings

"Wang Wang Blues" is one of the most recorded jazz songs, recorded by Henry Busse, Glenn Miller, Duke Ellington, Mamie Smith, Sam Moore and Horace Davis, Gus Van and Joe Schenck in the Ziegfeld Follies, 1921, Fletcher Henderson, Sam Lanin, Benny Goodman, King Oliver, Lucille Hegamin, Bennie Krueger, Ted Lewis, Doc Severinsen, Billy Butterfield, Bob Wills and His Texas Playboys, Eubie Blake, Mal Hallett, Lawrence Welk, Art Tatum, Edyie Gorme, Bobby Hackett, the Orient Dixieland Jazz Band, the Ames Brothers, Tim Brymn and His Black Devil Orchestra, the Norfolk Jazz Quartet, Willy Metschke, and Barbara McNair.

Media
The song was featured in the 1996 movie The English Patient in a performance by Benny Goodman.

References

Bibliography

Paul Whiteman: Pioneer of American Music (Volume 1: 1890–1930), Studies in Jazz, No. 43, by Don Rayno, The Scarecrow Press, Inc., 2003.
Pops: Paul Whiteman, King of Jazz, by Thomas A. DeLong, New Century Publishers, 1983.
Jazz by Paul Whiteman, J. H. Sears, 1926.

1920 songs
1921 singles
American jazz songs
Songs written by Leo Wood
Jazz compositions
Songs written by Henry Busse